Amy Madison is a fictional character on the television series Buffy the Vampire Slayer, portrayed by Elizabeth Anne Allen. The character appears in every season of Buffy except Season Five (during which time the character was stuck in the form of a rat due to a spell cast in Season Three).

In the show, Amy is a witch. Although initially a seemingly good-natured individual, Amy gradually begins misusing her magic, eventually becoming an enemy to Willow (Alyson Hannigan) and her friends. In the series' comic book continuation, the character is more of an outright villain.

Appearances

Television
Amy is a classmate of Buffy Summers at Sunnydale High School. In junior high, she would often go over to Willow's house and eat brownies to escape her mother's abuse. The character first appears in the Season One episode "Witch", when she and Buffy both try out for the cheerleading squad. At first, Amy performs poorly in the tryouts, but when a series of strange injuries to other contestants move her up in the standings, the Scooby Gang suspects that something is afoot. It is revealed that Amy's mother Catherine, a very powerful witch, has switched bodies with Amy because she wants to relive her youth. Buffy and the Scooby Gang succeed in restoring Amy to her own body and (unknown to them) trapping her mother in the cheerleading trophy she won while a cheerleader for Sunnydale High (her nickname was Catherine the Great due to her cheerleading prowess). Afterward, Amy talks to Buffy and mentions that she is now living with her father and step-mother, and that she is much happier.

The character appears as a Sunnydale student in other episodes. Along with Jonathan Levinson and Harmony Kendall, she is one of many recurring student characters. In the Season Two episode "Bewitched, Bothered and Bewildered", Xander Harris discovers that Amy inherited her mother's power, having become a potent, if sometimes ineffective, witch. Xander blackmails Amy into helping him perform a love spell on Cordelia Chase, however, the spell goes awry and causes the entire female population of Sunnydale, except Cordelia, to become infatuated with Xander. Under the influence of her own spell, a jealous Amy invokes the goddess Hecate and temporarily turns Buffy into a rat. Eventually, Rupert Giles forces Amy to undo both spells.

In Season Three, the character has joined a coven with Willow (now a practicing witch) and warlock Michael Czajak. In the episode "Gingerbread", the parents of Sunnydale (under the influence of the demonic Hans and Greta) become paranoid about the supernatural's influence on their children, and prepare to burn Amy, Buffy, and Willow at the stake. To escape her bonds, Amy turns herself into a rat, but then, being a rat, she is unable to remove her own spell. Willow captures Rat-Amy and keeps her in a cage until the spell can be reversed. Willow makes several unsuccessful attempts to return Amy to human form over the next two seasons. In the Season Four episode "Something Blue", Willow, who, at this time, has the power to make anything she wants happen, accidentally turns Amy back into a human; however, Willow does not even notice, and a few seconds later accidentally changes the character back into a rat. Doug Petrie, a writer on the show, describes this series of events as "as cruel and funny as anything could be".

By Season Six, Willow has become an extremely powerful witch and permanently "de-rats" Amy simply by conjuring an incantation. The two become friends again, though Amy now seems to be drastically different from before she turned into a rat. The character had apparently been involved with the warlock Rack before becoming a rat. Amy gets Willow involved as well, leading her to become addicted to black magic. Later, when Willow decides to give up magic, Amy casts a spell on her, causing her to magically manipulate everything she touches for a while; Willow complains that Amy's actions are encumbering her attempts to quit magic. Amy responds by mocking her, implying that she did it as revenge for being trapped as a rat for years. As a result, Willow cuts Amy out of her life entirely.

Amy's final appearance in the television series occurs in the Season Seven episode "The Killer in Me." When asked her feelings about Amy's actions in this episode, Elizabeth Anne Allen said, "I think after all the things that she went through, there were a lot of reasons why she was so angry."

Having physically transformed into Warren Mears, whom she tortured and flayed in a rage over the murder of her girlfriend Tara Maclay, Willow seeks help from the UC Sunnydale Wicca Group and discovers that Amy is a member. Amy explains that she had hit "rock bottom", and was doing much better now. It is soon revealed, however, that Amy is in fact responsible for Willow's transformation, the result of a hex placed on her apparently out of jealousy and spite. However, in the Season Eight comic book, it's made known this seemingly random event is actually part of a larger plan orchestrated by Warren, after Amy rescued him from death in the earlier episode "Villains."

Allen says she would have liked to explore Amy's struggle to overcome her anger, so that she could "get a grip and come back to the fold with her friends."

Literature

In the first issue of the Season Eight comic book story "The Long Way Home," an expedition of the United States Army finds Amy living sixty feet under the Hellmouth after its collapse with her "boyfriend," an unrevealed creature whom General Voll regards with disgust. Her first words to an exploratory member were "I'm gonna help you kill her." In exchange for their cooperation, Amy requests unlimited access to all the government's magical hardware as well as a weapons lab for her "boyfriend"; and if they succeed in taking Buffy down, Amy wants full immunity and release for the both of them.

Amy attacks Buffy at the Slayers' base in Scotland, putting her under a mystical sleep that only a kiss of someone's love can undo. Raising an army of kilted zombies to battle the Slayers, Amy battles Willow mid-air before being stepped on by Buffy's now-giant sister Dawn Summers. As Willow magically probes Amy's whereabouts, she is pulled through a portal to be "greeted" by a saw-wielding and skinless Warren Mears. As Warren tortures Willow, Amy faces off against Satsu and an awakened Buffy, who manages to channel enough of Willow's magic to defeat a demon that Amy conjured. Having seen her dream space while asleep, Buffy takes the form of Amy's worst nightmare: her mother. Distracted, Amy fails to notice a grenade thrown at her feet by Satsu, and as Buffy and Satsu charge into the room containing Willow, they see Amy appear and teleport away with Warren in her arms.

Later, in "Time of Your Life," Amy and Warren are shown working under direct orders from Twilight, under whom Voll served. Together they construct a missile covered in mystical runes and candles and use it to destroy a Scottish citadel, killing seven of the many Slayers residing there. The couple continues to squabble over tactical and romantic disagreements; Amy can identify the Slayers' location and powerless status in Tibet using a cat disguise after previous magical and military attempts at detecting them failed in the "Retreat" arc. When Twilight betrays Amy and Warren, she attempts to switch sides and forms a truce with Buffy in "Twilight." In the final arc, "Last Gleaming," Amy and Warren have fled far from the final battle scene. At its conclusion, after Buffy destroys an ancient relic and effectively brings about the end of magic on Earth, the spell keeping Warren alive breaks, and Amy watches as he suddenly turns into a pile of blood and bones.

Amy does not appear in the Season Eight sequel Buffy the Vampire Slayer Season Nine, nor its companion series Angel & Faith, but does appear in the second volume of Angel & Faith, tying into Buffy the Vampire Slayer Season Ten, in issue four. In the story, magic was recently restored to the world at the conclusion of Buffy Season Nine, while London in Angel & Faith was the site of a failed attempt by Whistler to restore magic which resulted in the mass mutation of locals in one borough, creating the ghetto known as 'Magic Town.' Amy is based out of Magic Town and preparing for revenge against Angel, while hoarding bottles of 'pure magic' left over from Whistler's plot. Amy approaches Angel claiming to seek his help in resurrecting Warren from the jar of his guts she collected, by using the new raw energy of Magic Town. Angel refuses and Amy gleefully reveals she expected that and was planning on fighting Angel to test her new magical strength with the bottles in preparation to kill Willow. Angel calls on Nadira the Slayer and new seer of Magic Town to stop Amy. Amy's intended trap for Willow with the magic from the bottles is easily broken by Nadira who explains the energy of Magic Town is sentient and her friend. Nadira and the energy of Magic Town turn Amy into a helpless rat once again. Angel has another friend, Alasdair Coames, who keeps the last of the magical bottles and the jar of Warren's remains.

Powers and abilities
Amy is a powerful witch with abilities inherited from her mother. These powers grow throughout the series. While initially more powerful than Willow, casting a spell to become a rat that Willow cannot initially reverse, Amy acknowledges in Season Seven that Willow has surpassed her. Willow comments that Amy's newfound power in Season Eight (which she claims has grown since the events of "Chosen") has been technologically augmented to some degree, with Amy commenting that she has grown consistently stronger stranded in the ruins of Sunnydale. In battle, Amy is able to stand up against Willow and fly by force of will.

Romantic interests
Xander Harris - After a spell Amy casts which was supposed to make Cordelia love Xander goes wrong, she, along with every other woman in Sunnydale, falls in love with Xander ("Bewitched, Bothered and Bewildered"). This attraction ends after Rupert Giles gets Amy to reverse the spell.
Larry Blaisdell - Amy stated that she thought Larry was considering asking her to the prom, apparently unaware he was gay and the fact that the graduation of her class occurred three years before, when Larry died.
Warren Mears - Amy's skinless boyfriend in Season Eight. It is revealed in "The Long Way Home" that the two had been in a relationship since "Villains", where after Warren was flayed alive by Willow, Amy saved his life. Amy refers to Warren as "sweetie", while he claims that "her magic is my skin."

Appearances
Amy has appeared in 32 Buffyverse episodes and comics.
 Buffy the Vampire Slayer  Amy appeared as a guest in 8 episodes:
Season 1 (1997) - "Witch"
Season 2 (1998) - "Bewitched, Bothered and Bewildered"
Season 3 (1999) - "Gingerbread"
Season 4 (1999) - "Something Blue"
Season 6 (2001–02) - "Smashed"; "Wrecked"; "Doublemeat Palace"
Season 7 (2003) - "The Killer in Me"

Buffy the Vampire Slayer Classics  Amy appeared in 1 issue:
"Bad Blood, Part Three: A Boy Named Sue"

Buffy the Vampire Slayer Season Eight  Amy appeared in 16 issues:
"The Long Way Home, Parts 1-4"
"Time of Your Life, Part 1 & 4"
"Retreat, Part 2, 3 & 5"
"Twilight, Part 1-4"
"Last Gleaming, Part 1, 3 & 4"

Buffy the Vampire Slayer Season Ten  Amy appeared in 7 issues:
"Where the River Meets the Sea, Part 1 & 4"
"Lost and Found, Part 1-5"

References

External links

Buffy the Vampire Slayer characters
Buffyverse characters who use magic
Fictional witches
Comics characters who use magic
Female characters in comics
Female supervillains
Television characters introduced in 1997
Fictional characters who can teleport
Fictional mice and rats
Fictional necromancers
Fictional private military members
Fictional shapeshifters
Fictional telekinetics
Television supervillains
American female characters in television
Fictional high school students

sv:Buffy och vampyrerna#Amy Madison